Bamber Gascoyne of Childwall Hall, Lancashire (1758 – 17 January 1824), was a British politician. He was an ancestor of two British Prime Ministers, Robert Gascoyne-Cecil, 3rd Marquess of Salisbury, and Arthur Balfour.

He was the son of Bamber Gascoyne (senior) and Mary Green.

He was Member of Parliament for Liverpool from 1780 to 1796. He was succeeded as MP for Liverpool by his brother Isaac.

He spoke in Parliament against the abolition of the slave trade, and led the opposition to the Sierra Leone settlement bill, which successfully incorporated the Sierra Leone Company in 1791.

He was married to Sarah Bridget Frances Price, born in 1767, daughter of Chase Price and Susan Glanvile. Their daughter Frances Mary Gascoyne (c. 1806 – 15 October 1839) married, on 2 February 1821, James Gascoyne-Cecil, 2nd Marquess of Salisbury. They became the parents of Prime Minister Robert Gascoyne-Cecil, 3rd Marquess of Salisbury, and the grandparents of Prime Minister Arthur Balfour.

References

1758 births
1824 deaths
British MPs 1780–1784
British MPs 1784–1790
British MPs 1790–1796
Members of the Parliament of Great Britain for Liverpool
People from Childwall